The Rahimoon, "Rahuma" , "Royma" ,"Rahimoon", "Rayma" (Dhatti lang-sd) see)and also known as  are a Muslim community found in the state of Chohatan Sedwa Shiv Gadraroad Ramsar Taluka in  Barmer Rajasthan Gujarat in India and a province of Umarkot Chachro Tharparkar Sindh and Balouchistan in Pakistan . They are one of a number of communities of pastoral nomads found in the Banni region of Kutch.  The community is also known  as Rahuma, especially in Sindh.

History and origin

The Royma are community original from Jaisalmer Rajputana and Gujarat belonged to Samma clan who were converted to Islam before İslam they were called Rathore and Thakurs but after accepting Islam they changed their surnames to samma were called sammas and then some of clans changed their names into different surnames such as Rahimo , Abro , Node , Sameja , Mahar , Mangria.They initially migrated to Sukhpar village in Bhuj taluka, and then spread to other parts of Bhuj, Mandvi, Anjan and Lakhpat region of Kutch Taluka and then migrated to other parts of subcontinent. They are now mainly in Tharparkar and karachi regions of Sindh Pakistan . They speak Marwari and Dhatki languages, with large number of Sindhi loanwords.
Royma are called Sammaat Tribe of Tharparkar which also includes Nodes , Mahar , Sameja and Mangria.

Present circumstances

The community is divided into a number of clans, called ataks, the chief ones being Mammia, Saad and Bidkia. They use the atak name as their surname. The community is endogamous, but does marry with other Samma communities, such as the Sameja. They do not practice clan exogamy as rule, but each clan is of equal status, and do intermarry. The community in fact prefer parallel cousin marriages.
The royma in Thar region of Sindh marry among other samma tribes and are divided in further clans chiefly called Dina , Dallu and Mammia.

The Royma are farmers and businessmen in Pakistan, while in addition to business they have large numbers of doctors , engineers and lawyers from Tharparkar region, some of the people in this community prefer to go outside of the country and earn their bread in foreign lands such as Saudia Arabia, Iran , Turkey , China , Afghanistan , Germany, Canada and other European countries. Before the 1990 era when Zia UL haque was in reign in Pakistan the concept of education was not in the mind of common folks so they preferred their children to learn tactics of business and farming but after 1991 they prioritized education and began to learn. Now in 21st century era there are still some people who don't have money to buy bread so they send their children to other cities so that they can earn their daily bread . While royma in India belong to Maldhari community  Like other Kutchi communities, many of them have migrated to other parts of India in search of employment.  Like many Gujarati Muslims, they have a caste association, the Royma Jamat, which is responsible for the welfare of the community. They are Sunni Muslims.

See also
Samma
Sindhi Rajputs

References

Social groups of Gujarat
Tribes of Kutch
Maldhari communities
Muslim communities of India
Sindhi tribes

Muslim communities of Gujarat
Sindhi tribes in India